Julián Oscar Etulain (born 21 June 1988) is an Argentine professional golfer who plays on the PGA Tour.

Amateur career
Before turning professional in 2008, Etulain had won the Argentine Amateur Championship and had represented Argentina at a number of events including the 2008 Eisenhower Trophy.

Professional career
In 2009, Etulain was named as the Tour de las Américas Rookie of the Year in his first full season as a professional golfer. Following this, he had a successful 2010 with two wins on the Tour de las Américas and finishing at the top of the Tour de las Americas Order of Merit. In 2011, he won a further two times on the Tour de las Americas finishing fifth on the Order of Merit and in doing so earned his 2012 PGA Tour Latinoamérica card.

In 2013, Etulian won the Lexus Peru Open on PGA Tour Latinoamérica and finished in sixth place on the Order of Merit. Following this, Etulian was able to gain conditional status on the Web.com Tour for 2014.

During 2014 Etulain continued to play on PGA Tour Latinoamérica, and in May won his second title at the Lexus Panama Classic. He then successfully defended the Lexus Peru Open in October. In doing so Etulain became the first golfer to successfully defend a tournament on PGA Tour Latinoamérica and the first three-time winner on the tour. He also finished second at the TransAmerican Power Products CRV Open and third at the Dominican Republic Open and Mazatlán Open. This earned him US$92,394 and the PGA Tour Latinoamérica Order of Merit.

In 2015, Etulain finished in second place at the Brasil Champions, ninth at the News Sentinel Open and tenth at the Stonebrae Classic. He finished 39th in the Web.com Tour regular season, but had poor results in the Finals and did not get a PGA Tour card. In 2016, he claimed a second place at the Chitimacha Louisiana Open and two sixth places at the Rex Hospital Open and Nashville Golf Open, finishing 20th in the regular season money list. During the Web.com Tour finals, he claimed a second place finish at the DAP Championship, therefore he finished ninth in the overall money list, earning a PGA Tour card for the 2017 season.

Amateur wins
 Argentine Amateur Championship

Professional wins (11)

Web.com Tour wins (1)

Web.com Tour playoff record (0–1)

PGA Tour Latinoamérica wins (4)

Tour de las Américas wins (4)

PGA Tour Latinoamérica Developmental Series wins (1)

Other wins (1)
 2010 Abierto del Club Militar en Bogotá (Colombian Tour)

Team appearances
 Eisenhower Trophy (representing Argentina): 2008

See also
2016 Web.com Tour Finals graduates
2018 Web.com Tour Finals graduates

References

External links
 
 

Argentine male golfers
PGA Tour Latinoamérica golfers
PGA Tour golfers
Korn Ferry Tour graduates
Sportspeople from Buenos Aires Province
People from Coronel Suárez Partido
1988 births
Living people